Oroko, also Bakundu-Balue or Balundu-Bima, is a poorly known Bantu dialect cluster spoken in Cameroon.

Varieties are Kundu/Nkundu (Lokundu, Bakundu), Lue (Lolue, Balue), Mbonge, Ekombe, Londo (Londo ba Nanga; cf. Londo), Londo ba Diko, Ngolo (Longolo; cf. Ngolo dialect), Bima, Tanga (Lotanga, Batanga), and Koko (Lokoko, Bakoko: distinct from Bakoko language). Maho (2009) treats these as ten distinct languages.

Writing system

References

Sawabantu languages
Languages of Cameroon